John Wilkin (28 April 1924 – 27 December 2017) was an Australian cricketer. He played in one first-class match for South Australia in 1949/50.

See also
 List of South Australian representative cricketers

References

External links
 

1924 births
2017 deaths
Australian cricketers
South Australia cricketers
Cricketers from Adelaide